Ki-jung, also spelled Kee-chung, Ki-jeong, or Gi-jung, is a Korean unisex given name. Its meaning differs based on the hanja used to write each syllable of the name. There are 68 hanja with the reading "ki" and 75 hanja with the reading "jung" on the South Korean government's official list of hanja which may be registered for use in given names.

People with this name include:
Sohn Kee-chung (1914–2002), Korean Olympic marathon runner of the Japanese colonial period, later a South Korean coach
Cho Ki-jung (1939–2007), South Korean potter
Park Ki-jung (born 1970), South Korean sprint canoer 
Kim Gi-jung (born 1990), South Korean badminton player
Lee Ki-jeong (born 1995), South Korean curler

See also
Kim Ki-jung (born 2001), South Korean singer, member of boy bands IM and UNB
List of Korean given names

References

Korean masculine given names